Prince of Persia 4 can refer to several different games in the Prince of Persia series, depending on how the count is done:

 Prince of Persia: The Sands of Time, counting the entire series
 Prince of Persia (2008 video game), counting only the Ubisoft games
 Prince of Persia: The Forgotten Sands, counting only the Sands of Time continuity